Reza Sixo Safai is an Iranian-born American director, actor and producer.

Filmography

References

External links

1972 births
Living people
American male film actors
University of California, Los Angeles alumni
Male actors from Palo Alto, California
Film directors from California
Iranian emigrants to the United States
Iranian diaspora film people